Barney Kessel's Swingin' Party (subtitled at Contemporary) is an album by guitarist Barney Kessel recorded in 1960 but not released on the Contemporary label until 1963. The album features the recording debut of Gary Peacock.

Reception

The Allmusic review by Scott Yanow states: "Loose, open, and off the cuff, Barney Kessel's Swingin' Party at Contemporary finds Kessel and company in great form. For fans and guitar aficionados who missed the party, this swinging set will serve as a fine substitute".

Track listing
 "Bluesology" (Milt Jackson) - 9:18
 "Lover Man" (Jimmy Davis, Ram Ramirez, James Sherman) - 4:53
 "Joy Spring" (Clifford Brown) - 6:50
 "Now's the Time" (Charlie Parker) - 8:20
 "Miss Memphis" (Marvin Jenkins) - 6:29
 "New Rhumba" (Ahmad Jamal) - 7:15

Personnel
Barney Kessel - guitar
Marvin Jenkins - piano, flute
Gary Peacock - bass
Ron Lundberg - drums

References

Contemporary Records albums
Barney Kessel albums
1963 albums